Lesley Diana Joseph (born 14 October 1945) is an English actress and broadcaster, best known for playing Dorien Green in the television sitcom Birds of a Feather from 1989 to 1998 and again from 2014 to 2020. Other television credits include Absurd Person Singular (1985) and Night and Day (2001–2003).

Her stage roles include UK touring productions of Thoroughly Modern Millie (2005), Calendar Girls (2011) and Annie (2015). In 2018, she was nominated for the Olivier Award for Best Supporting Actress in a Musical, for the original West End production of Young Frankenstein.

Early life
Joseph was born, on 14 October 1945, in Finsbury Park, Haringey, London, England. She grew up in Kingsthorpe, Northampton and attended Northampton School for Girls.

Career

Stage
In May 1973, Joseph appeared in Godspell at the Pavilion Theatre, Bournemouth.

Joseph appeared in Cinderella at Theatre Royal, Plymouth in 2008 and the Orchard Theatre in Dartford in 2009, and starred as Myra Wilson in the UK Tour of Hot Flush!. In 2014, Hot Flush! embarked on its third UK tour.

From 4 December 2010 to 22 January 2011, she appeared at The Grand Opera House, Belfast as the Wicked Queen in the pantomime Snow White and the Seven Dwarfs.

In the Summer of 2011, Joseph appeared as Chris in the stage show Calendar Girls, based on the film of the same name.

In 2014/15, she performed at the Theatre Royal Nottingham as the Wicked Queen in Snow White and the Seven Dwarfs.

In 2015, she appeared as Miss Hannigan in the stage production of Annie at certain venues, sharing the role with Jodie Prenger and Elaine C Smith she was cast as the fairy godmother in Cinderella at the cliffs pavilion (Southend on sea). In 2016/17, she was part of the cast in Snow White and the Seven Dwarfs at the Theatre Royal, Plymouth. Joseph then portrayed Frau Blucher in the West End production of Young Frankenstein.

Birds of a Feather

From 1989 to 1998, Joseph played Dorien Green in the BBC One sitcom Birds of a Feather, alongside Pauline Quirke and Linda Robson.

Further TV work
Joseph starred in the ITV soap Night and Day from 2001 to 2003 playing the show's resident bitch, Rachel Culgrin. In 2002, Joseph appeared on a special edition of What Not to Wear, where she was given a makeover by Trinny Woodall and Susannah Constantine. In 2004, she performed in The Vagina Monologues opposite Linda Robson and Mica Paris.

Since 2009, she has been a regular newspaper reviewer on This Morning. She appeared in the 2014 series Secrets of the Asylum, a two-part series for ITV. In 2015, Joseph took part in ITV's celebrity sheep herding series Flockstars, beginning on 30 July.

In 2014, Joseph appeared with Forrest Dunbar on ITV2's Freshers: A Year On. She makes frequent appearances on Channel 5's Big Brother's Bit on the Side.

On 22 August 2016, it was announced that Joseph would take part in the fourteenth series of Strictly Come Dancing. She was partnered with Anton du Beke. In their first week, the couple scored 23 points for their waltz to "What'll I Do", in week two, 26 for their cha-cha-cha to "Perhaps, Perhaps, Perhaps", in week three, 27 for their quickstep for "A Couple of Swells" from Easter Parade and in week four, 31 for their Charleston to "Won't You Charleston with Me?" from The Boy Friend. The couple left the series in week five, after scoring 24 for their tango to "Whatever Lola Wants".

She was one of the four competitors who appeared in the special Christmas edition of  The Great British Sewing Bee that was transmitted on New Year's Eve 2020 on BBC 1. Her fellow competitors in the programme were Sabrina Grant, Sally Phillips and The Vivienne.

In 2022, Joseph appeared on the seventh series of Celebrity Coach Trip alongside her Birds of a Feather co-star Linda Robson.

Radio
Joseph began a radio show in 2008 on BBC London 94.9 with Christopher Biggins, airing every Sunday between 9am to 12noon. Biggins left the show after a few months, but Joseph has continued to host. She also stands in for Vanessa Feltz on her weekday morning talk when Feltz is on holiday.

Personal life
Joseph is Jewish.
She has two children.

Joseph's mother, Rebecca Mundy (née Maccoby) was born in May 1912 and died in March 2016, aged 103.

Filmography

Theatre Credits

References

External links

Lesley Joseph at the British Film Institute

1945 births
English stage actresses
English television actresses
Jewish English actresses
Living people
People from Northampton
People from Hackney Central